Sam Osman is an author and freelance film maker.

Biography
Osman read modern languages at Cambridge University before joining the BBC as a general trainee. She has lived and worked in London, Lebanon, Sudan and Washington DC and lives with her husband and three children in London.

She has, to date, one published children's novel, Quicksilver, which explores the themes of leylines, stone circles and ancient holy sites such as Stonehenge in England, Meroe in Sudan and Mount Shasta in the United States.

Quicksilver
Quicksilver was her debut novel.

Critically it has received reviews from Amanda Craig in The Times. and Rosemary Stones in books for keeps.

References

External links
 Interview and article on Megalithic Portal.
 Author's official website.
 Trailer to Quicksilver trailer on YouTube.

British children's writers
Living people
Year of birth missing (living people)